Cornelia Hanisch (born 12 June 1952) is a retired German fencer. She won a gold medal in the team foil and a silver in the individual foil at the 1984 Summer Olympics. Between 1977 and 1985, she won ten medals in the foil at world championships, including four gold medals.

In 1980, she received Silbernes Lorbeerblatt.

References

External links
 

1952 births
Living people
Sportspeople from Frankfurt
German female fencers
German foil fencers
Olympic fencers of West Germany
Fencers at the 1976 Summer Olympics
Fencers at the 1984 Summer Olympics
Olympic gold medalists for West Germany
Olympic silver medalists for West Germany
Olympic medalists in fencing
Medalists at the 1984 Summer Olympics
Universiade medalists in fencing
Universiade silver medalists for West Germany
Medalists at the 1977 Summer Universiade
Medalists at the 1979 Summer Universiade